XHDT-FM is a radio station on 98.3 FM in Ciudad Cuauhtémoc, Chihuahua. The station is owned by GRD Multimedia and carries a pop format known as Like 98.3 FM.

History
XHDT began as XEDT-AM 1080, receiving its concession on March 27, 1989. It was owned by Raúl Mendoza Villalba. On August 30, 2005, XEDT was authorized to move to 900 and increase its power from 1 to 5 kW.

XEDT was authorized to move to FM in 2011. In July 2017, it dropped the Hits name and Multimedios Radio logo, likely in preparation for MM Radio to launch its own Hits FM station in the market.

References

External links
Like 98.3 FM Facebook
GRD Multimedia Website

Radio stations in Chihuahua